The 2012–2013 flu season was an epidemic flu season in the United States.

United States
By the week ending 29 December 2012, the CDC reported that 29 U.S. states had high numbers of reports of flu. By 13 January, nearly all U.S. states had experienced elevated influenza levels.

In 9 January after the city of Boston received reports of 700 cases of flu and 4 deaths, the city declared a public health emergency. Boston Mayor Thomas Menino said that "people should take the threat of flu seriously" and that people should receive the influenza vaccine and practice health safety.

By 7 January 2013, there were 15,000 cases of flu reported in the state of New York. In the previous year's entire flu season, there were only 4,400 cases in the same region. New York Governor Andrew Cuomo declared a Public Health Emergency, relaxing regulations as to whom pharmacists can immunize.

Vaccination
The U.S. Centers for Disease Control recommends that all persons in the United States receive an annual influenza vaccine. In January 2013, the CDC reported that the vaccine available in the United States had a 62% vaccine efficacy with a 95% confidence interval of 51%-71%.

China
Influenza A virus subtype H3N2 infections have predominated in China, which since November has reported low levels of flu infection

European Union
The European Union reported low but increasing levels of flu infection in the first week of 2013.

See also
 United States influenza statistics by flu season

References

External links
 the CDC's frequently asked questions about the 2012-2013 flu season

2013 disasters in the United States
2013
Influenza
2013 health disasters
2012 health disasters
2012 disasters in the United States
2012 disasters in China
2013 in Europe
2013 disasters in China
2012 in Europe